Greigia pearcei is a plant species in the genus Greigia. This species is endemic to Chile.

References

pearcei
Flora of Chile